The Body is a 2019 Indian Hindi-language mystery-thriller film written and directed by Jeethu Joseph, produced by Viacom18 Studios and Sunir Kheterpal. The film starring Rishi Kapoor, Emraan Hashmi, Vedhika and Sobhita Dhulipala. It is the official remake of a 2012 Spanish film The Body, which was already remade unofficially as bilingual films in Kannada and Tamil languages as Game in Kannada and Oru Melliya Kodu in Tamil (2016 film).

The film was released on 13 December 2019.
This marked the final film appearance of Kapoor before his death on 30 April 2020.

Plot 
The dead body of a powerful businesswoman named Maya Verma, who died because of having a heart attack, disappeared from the morgue before the autopsy. SP Jairaj Rawal calls in Maya's husband, Ajay Puri, for investigation. Ajay Puri, who is the owner of a lab and worked under Maya's company seemed to have committed something wrong along with his girlfriend Ritu.

Jairaj suspects Ajay and makes him stay in the morgue until Maya's corpse is found. Strange incidents start to happen with Ajay. He feels Maya's presence around him and gradually gets clues including the bottle of cardiotoxin (TH-16) which he had used to induce a heart attack in Maya's body and also gets a phone in another corpse's bag having the calls only from Maya. All these events make him believe that Maya is still alive and is playing a game with him to take her revenge.

In a flashback, it is shown that Maya always used to dominate Ajay with her money and power. Ajay's possessiveness and his affair with Ritu made him kill Maya and made it look like a heart attack by using a cardiotoxin which takes about 8 hours to work. In the morgue, Ajay continuously keeps contact with Ritu and they find out that Maya knew about their relationship by hiring a private detective named Tony D'Costa. Ajay tells Ritu to run away to a safe place as he feels that Maya is after her. When Ajay fails to contact Ritu, he confesses everything to Jairaj out of fear and requests him to save Ritu from Maya. In the meantime, Jairaj gets a call from his team that they have found a female corpse which is revealed to be Maya's. When Jairaj orders the police to arrest Ajay, he tries to run away but falls down due to chestpain.

Finally, it is revealed that Ritu is none other than Jairaj's daughter Isha. Everything that has happened to Maya and Ajay since the last night was their plan. Yet again, in a flashback, it is revealed that Jairaj's wife Nancy, who died in a car accident was hit by a drunk Maya and Ajay and instead of helping them, they return to the crime scene and hit the car again as Ajay had noticed that the little girl sitting on back seat has seen them. After 10 years, when Isha recognizes Ajay and Maya in her university, she plans a revenge along with her father. Isha attracts Ajay towards her and starts an affair.

At the end, Jairaj discloses to Ajay that he is going to have a heart attack from cardiotoxin, which he had used to kill Maya, which Ritu (Isha) had mixed in his drink 8 hours ago.

Cast 
 Rishi Kapoor as SP Jairaj Rawal (The investigating officer of Maya's case)
 Emraan Hashmi as Ajay Puri (Maya's husband & killer and Ritu's love interest)
 Sobhita Dhulipala as Maya Varma (Ajay's wife and a rich & powerful businesswoman)
 Vedhika as Ritu Jha (fake name) / Isha Rawal (Jairaj's daughter)
Meenakshi Anoop as Little Isha
 Arif Zakaria as Mohammed Shekhawat
 Rukhsar Rehman as Dr. Tanya Mehra
 Anupam Bhattacharya as Pawan Sinha (Jairaj's assistant and junior officer)
 Tara Singh as Morgue's security guard
 Chandan K Anand as Keith Suliman
 Nataša Stanković (Special appearance in song "Jhalak Dikhla Jaa Reloaded")
 Scarlet Mellish Wilson (Special appearance in song "Jhalak Dikhla Jaa Reloaded")

Soundtrack

The film features songs composed by Shamir Tandon, Arko and Tanishk Bagchi with lyrics written by Arko, Kumaar, Manoj Muntashir and Sameer Anjaan. 
Live strings produced, arranged and engineered by Randy Slaugh.
The song "Jhalak Dikhlaja Reloaded" is the remake of Himesh Reshammiya's song from Emraan Hashmi's Aksar, recreated by Tanishk Bagchi.

Reception

Critical reviews 
Pallabi Dey Purkayastha of The Times of India gave the film, a rating of 2.5 out of 5 and wrote "The Body is low on content and high on glamour. There is not much to unravel in this one."  Hindustan Times wrote "As the series of events unfold, you’re shown flashbacks which are, each time, topped with a romantic song. Even though they’re shot at the most picturesque locales and look pretty, they totally take you away from the story." Saibal Chatterjee of NDTV gave 2 out of 5 and wrote "The Body has no scope for Bollywood-style romance but it insists on banking on plenty of it framed against the picturesque backdrops on offer in the Indian Ocean nation where the story is set." Criticizing the plot and performances, Shubhra Gupta of Indian Express stated "Everything in it is flat: the plot, the performers, the alleged twists. And that must have taken some doing, given that the filmmakers had a ready-made plot to dip into." Filmfare wrote "What could have been a short film for a digital platform has unnecessarily been stretched as a feature. Weak writing, flawed editing and a disinterested cast doesn't help its prospects..." A reviewer for Koimoi stated "All said and done, The Body is a dull mysterious thriller in which the mystery unfolds when you care the least about it. It plays with your mind in a bad way to fill it with cluttered chaos."

References

External links 
 
 
 

2010s mystery thriller films
Indian mystery thriller films
Indian remakes of Spanish films
Films directed by Jeethu Joseph
2010s Hindi-language films